Escobedia is a genus of flowering plants belonging to the family Orobanchaceae.

Its native range is from Mexico to Southern Tropical America. It is found in the countries of; Argentina, Belize, Bolivia, Brazil, Colombia, Costa Rica, Ecuador, Guatemala, Honduras, Mexico, Nicaragua, Panamá, Paraguay, Peru and Venezuela.

The genus name of Escobedia is in honour of Jorge Escobedo y Alarcón (1743–1805), a Spanish lawyer and colonial administrator in Peru, and it was first described and published in Fl. Peruv. Prodr. on page 91 in 1794.

Known species:
Escobedia brachydonta 
Escobedia crassipes 
Escobedia grandiflora 
Escobedia guatemalensis 
Escobedia laevis 
Escobedia michoacana 
Escobedia peduncularis

References

Orobanchaceae
Orobanchaceae genera
Plants described in 1794
Flora of South America